The 2007–08 Tulane Green Wave women's basketball team represented Tulane University in the 2007–08 NCAA Division I women's basketball season. The Green Wave were coached by Lisa Stockton. The Green Wave are a member of Conference USA and attempted to win the Conference USA Tournament.

Exhibition

Regular season
The Green Wave participated in the Caribbean Challenge in Cancun, Mexico from November 21 to 22.
The Green Wave participated in the DoubleTree Classic from December 20 to 21.

Schedule

Player stats

Postseason

Conference USA Tournament
Marshall 65, Tulane 58

Awards and honors
Ashley Langford, Doubletree Classic All-Tournament Team

Team players drafted into the WNBA
No one from the Green Wave was selected in the 2008 WNBA Draft.

See also
Tulane Green Wave

References

Tulane
Tulane Green Wave women's basketball seasons
Tulane
Tulane